The spongomonads are a group of flagellated protists in the phylum Cercozoa. Taxonomically, they compose the family Sarcomonadidae and order Sarcomonadida. They were originally placed among the Reticulofilosa, but were later transferred to Monadofilosa. It includes only two genera:
Spongomonas 
Rhipidodendron

References

Filosa
SAR supergroup unranked clades